Kremenski Lakes are a lake group in the Pirin mountains, southwestern Bulgaria composed of two larger and two smaller lakes situated in a narrow but salient cirque of the same name. They are surrounded by the peaks Sivriya and Dzhano and the Kremenski elevation which ends with Kremenski peak.

The Upper Kremen lake is situated at 2,352 m altitude. Its size is 335x270 m which makes an area of 66,1 decares. It is 13,6 m deep and has considerable amount of water estimated to 478,000 m³.
The Lower Kremen lake at 2,304 m is the largest in this group of lakes and the second largest in Pirin after the Popovo Lake. Its surface area is 98 decares. It is 27 m deep which makes it third in the mountain. It has an elongated form (500x275 m) and the amount of water is 1,000,000 m³.

References 

Lakes of the Pirin